Adriana Dávila Fernández (born 30 December 1970) is a Mexican politician affiliated with the PAN. She currently serves as Senator of the LXII Legislature of the Mexican Congress representing Tlaxcala. She also served as Deputy during the LX Legislature.

References

1970 births
Living people
Politicians from Tlaxcala
Members of the Senate of the Republic (Mexico)
Members of the Chamber of Deputies (Mexico)
National Action Party (Mexico) politicians
21st-century Mexican politicians
21st-century Mexican women politicians
Women members of the Chamber of Deputies (Mexico)
Women members of the Senate of the Republic (Mexico)
Mexican journalists
People from Apizaco